Blade Running is an English language hit in Norway for the Norwegian band Donkeyboy, their fifth single taken from their album Caught in a Life after singles "Ambitions" and "Sometimes" (both #1s for 13 and 8 weeks consecutively in the Norwegian Singles Chart), "Broke My Eyes" (that reached #6) and Awake (that reached #8)

"Blade Running" released in 2009 reached #8 in the Norwegian Singles Chart.

Charts

References 

2009 singles
Donkeyboy songs
2009 songs
Warner Music Group singles
Songs written by Simen Eriksrud
Songs written by Espen Berg (musician)
Songs written by Cato Sundberg